John Philip Baxter (31 December 1896 – 21 January 1975) was a British filmmaker active from the 1930s to the late-1950s. During that time, he produced, wrote, or directed several films. He directed Deborah Kerr in her first leading role in Love on the Dole (1941), and was the producer-director for the musical-comedy films of Flanagan and Allen during World War II.

Early life and career
Baxter was born on 31 December 1896 in Kent. He worked as a theatrical agent and theater manager. He became an assistant director in 1932. He formed his own production company with his friend John Barter. He also acted in several films produced by Lance Comfort.

Baxter played a major role in the foundation of National Film Finance Corporation in 1948. He also directed and produced Judgment Deferred (1952) which was the first film of Group 3, a British government backed production venture. His last film as a director was Ramsbottom Rides Again (1956) which featured Arthur Askey.

Death
Baxter died in London in 1975.

Filmography

Writer
The Heart Within (1957)

Further reading 
 Geoff Brown and Tony Aldgate (1989). The Common Touch: The Films of John Baxter. London: British Film Institute. .

External links

References

1896 births
1975 deaths
British film directors